Sodium/potassium-transporting ATPase subunit beta-3 is an enzyme that in humans is encoded by the ATP1B3 gene. ATP1B3 has also been designated as CD298 (cluster of differentiation 298).

The protein encoded by this gene belongs to the family of Na+/K+ and H+/K+ ATPases beta chain proteins, and to the subfamily of Na+/K+ -ATPases. Na+/K+ -ATPase is an integral membrane protein responsible for establishing and maintaining the electrochemical gradients of Na and K ions across the plasma membrane. These gradients are essential for osmoregulation, for sodium-coupled transport of a variety of organic and inorganic molecules, and for electrical excitability of nerve and muscle. This enzyme is composed of two subunits, a large catalytic subunit (alpha) and a smaller glycoprotein subunit (beta). The beta subunit regulates, through assembly of alpha/beta heterodimers, the number of sodium pumps transported to the plasma membrane. The glycoprotein subunit of Na+/K+ -ATPase is encoded by multiple genes. This gene encodes a beta 3 subunit. A pseudogene exists for this gene, and it is located on chromosome 2.

References

Further reading

External links
 
 

Clusters of differentiation